This is a recap of the 1978 season for the Professional Bowlers Association (PBA) Tour.  It was the tour's 20th season, and consisted of 35 events. Mark Roth set a PBA record by winning eight titles on the season, doubling his career total to 16. He also shattered Earl Anthony's single-season earnings record, taking home $134,500 in prize money.

Earl Anthony captured the second Firestone Tournament of Champions title of his career, in the process becoming the first PBA Player to reach 30 titles. Nelson Burton, Jr. won the BPAA U.S. Open, while Warren Nelson was the surprise winner at the MGM PBA National Championship.

Tournament schedule

References

External links
1978 Season Schedule

Professional Bowlers Association seasons
1978 in bowling